Events from the year 1636 in England.

Incumbents
 Monarch – Charles I
 Secretary of State – Sir John Coke

Events
 3 March – A "great charter" to the University of Oxford establishes the Oxford University Press as the second of the privileged presses.
 8 September – New College founded at the English colony of Massachusetts; later renamed 'Harvard'.
 9 October – John Hampden refuses to pay ship money after a third writ is issued.
 Unknown – Completion of excavation of Old Bedford River (begun in 1630).
 Unknown – Roger Williams founds the new English colony Rhode Island in North America
 Unknown – Construction concluded on the Jacobean mansion Crewe Hall

Births
 29 June – Thomas Hyde, orientalist (died 1703)
 29 September – Thomas Tenison, Archbishop of Canterbury (died 1715)
 7 October – Edward Wetenhall, bishop (died 1713)
 1 December – Elizabeth Capell, Countess of Essex, noblewoman (died 1718)
 27 December – John Dormer, born Huddleston, Jesuit priest (died 1700)

Deaths
 20 March – Thomas Puckering, politician (born 1592)
 18 April – Julius Caesar, judge  (born c. 1557)
 29 May – William Pitt, politician (born 1559)
 15 August – Robert Hitcham, lawyer and politician (born 1572)

References

 
Years of the 17th century in England